The Sich Riflemen Halych-Bukovyna Kurin were one of the first regular military units of the Ukrainian People's Army. The unit operated from 1917 to 1919 and was formed from Ukrainian soldiers of the Austro-Hungarian army, local population and former commanders of the Ukrainian Sich Riflemen in Austria-Hungary. 

The first kurin was formed in Kyiv on 13 November 1917. Commanded by Col. Yevhen Konovalets with his chief of staff Andriy Melnyk, the Sich Rifles had up to 25,000 men at their peak, including artillery, cavalry, reconnaissance and machine-gun units.The Sich Riflemen defended the government of UNR against the Bolshevik insurrection in the capital and later against regular Red Army forces that advanced into Ukraine in 1918. When Kyiv was recaptured in March 1918 the Ukrainian Sich Riflemen guarded government buildings in the capital and maintained order in the city. The unit later expanded to include two infantry detachments, a cavalry unit and an artillery battery. With the establishment of the Hetmanate of Pavlo Skoropadsky, the Sich Riflemen refused to serve him and were disarmed by the German forces that supported the hetman.

Soldiers from the unit joined other forces, notably Petro Bolbochan's 2nd Zaporozhian Regiment, and attempted to reestablish the unit under the new command. In August 1918, Skoropadsky finally allowed a partial re-establishment of the unit in Bila Tserkva. The new unit consisted of 1,200 men and was divided into an infantry regiment, an artillery battery and a technical unit. In Bila Tserkva, the Sich Riflemen led the revolt against hetman Skoropadsky and the ranks of the unit increased by November 1918 to 11,000. Later the two other Dnipro and Black Sea divisions joined the unit. In November 1918 with new recruits, the ranks of the Riflemen swelled to 25,000. It played a crucial role in the establishment of the Directorate under Symon Petliura. In December, the unit captured Kyiv and was subsequently divided into smaller units.

Different detachments of the unit fought against advancing Bolshevik armies in Ukraine. Together with the Directory, the Sich Riflemen fled from Kyiv when it was recaptured by the Bolsheviks. The Riflemen also fought on different fronts against General Denikin's White Russian forces. In 1919, the unit took heavy losses in combat and later from typhus. On 6 December 1919, the unit was finally demobilized. Some former soldiers were interned by the Polish army, others continued to fight in other smaller detachments in Ukraine.

See also 
 Ukrainian Sich Riflemen

Literature 
 Orest Subtelny. Ukraine. A history. University of Toronto Press. 1994. .
 Paul Robert Magocsi. The Roots of Ukrainian Nationalism: Galicia As Ukraine's Piedmont. University of Toronto Press. 2002. .
 Sich Riflemen during the January Uprising. Ukrayinska Pravda (Istorychna Pravda). 6 April 2012

Military units and formations of Ukraine
Ukrainian People's Republic
Aftermath of World War I in Ukraine
Ukrainian–Soviet War
1917 establishments in Ukraine
1919 disestablishments in Ukraine
Military units and formations established in 1917
Military units and formations disestablished in 1919